The Africanis is a dog landrace found across southern Africa.

Description 

As is typical with landraces, there are several regional variations, believed to be the result of isolation and, to a limited degree, deliberate breeding. Some modern writers describe the Africanis as a pariah dog. This is considered an inappropriate classification, as the term typically denotes an ownerless, free-ranging dog. Considered a landrace with limited human interference in their breeding, the Africanis has also been maintained by human owners.

The Africanis is a medium-sized, lightly built dog with a long slender muzzle and, usually, a short coat. It has been described as resembling a cross between a Greyhound, a terrier and a dingo. It can be found in almost any colour or combination of colours, although fawns, browns, brindles and blacks with various white markings are common. A distinctive, possibly primitive, feature is a black patch found high on the outside of the tail where the caudal gland is found in the wild wolf.

Being a landrace, minor variations in appearance may be common. The Africanis is nonetheless known to breed true to a recognisable form.

History 
Africa's indigenous dogs may be descended from ancient Egyptian dogs found throughout the Nile Delta around 5,900 years ago. It is believed the descendants of these dogs spread throughout Africa with tribal movements, first throughout the Sahara and finally reaching southern Africa around the 6th century AD.

The Africanis has almost always been attached to human settlements in southern Africa. The dogs could have been used to help herd sheep, goats and cattle, guard against predators and help their human companions in the hunt. The Africanis has been known by a number of names. These include the Bantu dog, Kasi dog, umbwa wa ki-shenzi ("traditional dog" in Kiswahili, the Khoekhoe dog, the Tswana dog and the Zulu dog. Other local names include Sica, Isiqha, Ixhalaga, Ixalagha, Isigola, I-Twina and Itiwina. In older texts the potentially offensive terms 'kaffir dog', 'kaffir brak' or 'kraal dog' were also used.

While generally looked down upon by European settlers who preferred their imported dog breeds, the Africanis was held in higher esteem by Europeans in Africa than the Indian pariah dog was in India.

In recent times efforts have been made to protect, preserve and promote these dogs, and prevent them from being split into a number of different breeds based upon different distinguishing physical features. In South Africa, a society has been established to preserve the Africanis, the Africanis Society of Southern Africa.

See also
 Dogs portal
 List of dog breeds
African village dog
Basenji

Notes

References

External links 
AfriCanis Society of Southern Africa
"Africanis, the original dog of Africa" by Mary Alexander, South Africa Gateway, 5 October 2020
The dog shaped by Africans for Africa, by Catherine Corrett, 31 October, 2014, Africa Geographic

Dog breeds originating in Africa
Dog landraces
Landraces of Africa